Lambuth McGeehee Clarke was the second president of Virginia Wesleyan College.

Education
He received a bachelor's from Randolph-Macon College, a master's from Johns Hopkins University and a doctorate of law from Randolph-Macon College.

Presidency of Virginia Wesleyan College
Lambuth McGeehee Clarke was the president of Virginia Wesleyan College when the college opened its doors in 1966 to its first students. He helped grow the college's student body from just 75 students to 1,440 in 1992 when he retired. The operating budget of the college grew as well with the increase in the student body from $250,000 to $14.6 million.

Personal life
Lambuth McGeehee Clarke was married to Alice A. Clarke, and together they had four children, son Palmore Clarke, and daughters, Virginia Clarke Hitch, Jessica Clarke and Leighton Clarke Krips.

References

1923 births
2006 deaths
Randolph–Macon College alumni
Johns Hopkins University alumni
Virginia Wesleyan University